The 2007 Torneo Descentralizado (known as the Copa Cable Mágico for sponsorship reasons) is the ninety-first season of Peruvian football. A total of 12 teams competed in the tournament, with Alianza Lima as the defending champion. Universidad San Martín won its first national title as it did not have to play in the season finals due to Coronel Bolognesi's poor performance in the Torneo Apertura. The season began on February 3, 2007 and ended on December 16, 2007.

Changes from 2006

Rule changes
Starting with the 2007 season, promotion of the Segunda División champion was re-introduced.

Promotion and relegation
Teams promoted to 2007 Torneo Descentralizado:
2006 Segunda División champion: Deportivo Municipal
2006 Copa Perú champion: Total Clean

Teams relegated to 2007 Segunda División:
José Gálvez
Unión Huaral

Season overview
Universidad San Martín de Porres won the Apertura, their first title, and qualified for their first Copa Libertadores. Coronel Bolognesi won the Clausura which was their first title too. In the Apertura they had placed last and were in danger of relegation. No national championship final was contested because Coronel Bolognesi did not finish in the top 6 of the Apertura. The national title went to Universidad San Martín, who had accumulated more points on the aggregate table. Coincidentally, both teams also participated in the Copa Sudamericana together in 2006. The final fixture of the Clausura had four potential winners. Aside from Bolognesi, Universitario de Deportes, Alianza Lima, Cienciano, and Sport Áncash had a chance at winning the title. They all won their last fixtures, however, Bolognesi also won its fixture and surpassed Universitario by one point. Despite not winning the Clausura, Cienciano qualified for the Copa Libertadores 2008 Preliminary Round, and Universitario and Sport Áncash qualified for the Copa Sudamericana 2008. Alianza Lima, however, finished the season empty-handed.

Sporting Cristal, a Peruvian giant, was in danger of relegation throughout the season. This was Cristal's worst season in its history. The team failed in the Apertura under the Argentine Sampaoli and the club decided to hire Juan Carlos Oblitas for the Clausura. At first he did not have much success but during the second half of the Clausura, they were undefeated for the remaining 11 games with 5 wins and 6 draws. Cristal finished tying the last fixture and remained in the First Division. The newly promoted Deportivo Municipal and Total Clean were relegated. Deportivo Municipal played its last fixture with its U-20 squad and as a result, Alianza Lima defeated them 6-0. The first-team squad did not play because the club did not pay them for several months.

Teams

Torneo Apertura

League table

Results

Torneo Clausura

League table

Results

Aggregate table

Season finals
No season finals were contested since the Apertura winners Universidad San Martín de Porres failed to finish in the top six of the Torneo Clausura and the Clausura winners Coronel Bolognesi failed to finish in the top six of the Torneo Apertura. Therefore, San Martín won the national title due to the team's better positioning on the aggregate table.

Top scorers
Sources:Peru.com  Peru.com 
19 goals
 Johan Fano (Universitario)
18 goals
 Ysrael Zúñiga (Melgar)
17 goals
 Paul Cominges (Coronel Bolognesi)
16 goals
 Richard Estigarribia (Sport Áncash)
15 goals
 Pedro García (U. San Martín)
13 goals
 Hernán Rengifo (U. San Martín)
 Mario Leguizamón (U. San Martín)
 José Fernández (Cienciano)
12 goals
 Junior Viza (Alianza Lima)
 Sebastián Dominguez (Total Clean)

References

External links
Peru 2007 by Eli Schmerler and Carlos Manuel Nieto Tarazona Details on RSSSF
Peruvian Football 

Peruvian Primera División seasons
Peru
Torneo Descentralizado, 2007